Potraš is a village in the municipalities of Lopare (Republika Srpska) and Tuzla, Tuzla Canton, Bosnia and Herzegovina.

Demographics 
According to the 2013 census, its population was 32, all Serbs living in the Lopare part, with no inhabitants in Tuzla.

References

Populated places in Lopare
Populated places in Tuzla